Candiac is a suburb of Montreal, in the Canadian province of Quebec; it is located on the South Shore of the Saint Lawrence River opposite Montreal near La Prairie. The population as of the Canada 2016 Census was 21,047.

History 
Candiac was created January 31, 1957, when the government of Quebec accepted the request of a Canadian-European investors group, the Candiac Development Corporation. The investors had collected over $4.5 million and bought  of land from farmers and the neighbouring towns.

In its early days, Candiac was home to 320 people who mostly lived near the St. Lawrence River. Most of the inhabitants were either farmers or Montrealers who owned a second residence in Candiac.

Candiac was named after the birthplace of Louis-Joseph de Montcalm, who was born in 1712 at Château de Candiac in Vestric-et-Candiac, near Nîmes, in France. Montcalm died at the Battle of the Plains of Abraham at Quebec City while fighting for the Kingdom of France in the Annus Mirabilis of 1759.

Coat of arms
Montcalm's heritage and the first mayor, Jean Leman, family's coat of arms were the inspiration for Candiac's coat of arms. The colour red symbolizes charity and justice, two very important values. It is also present in the Leman's coat of arms and is said to honour Montcalm's legacy. The silver cross is a typical French-Canadian symbol that reminds citizens of their French heritage. The stars were taken from the Leman's coat of arms and the towers from Montcalm's. The crown symbolizes the Château de Candiac and the maple leaves symbolize Canada.

The floral emblem of Candiac is the Campanula carpatica, better known as White Clips.

Demographics 

Infrastructure

Transportation
The CIT Le Richelain provides commuter and local bus services. Commuter trains provided by Exo link Candiac to Lucien L'Allier train station in downtown Montréal.

Municipal Buildings
The City of Candiac has four (4) main municipal buildings: the Hotel de Ville (city hall), Centre Roméo-V.-Patenaude (renovated in 2005), Centre Frank-Vocino (the old library, now the Ideal Club meeting area), and Centre Claude-Hébert (the new restored library).

Education 

The South Shore Protestant Regional School Board previously served the municipality.

See also
List of cities in Quebec
Roussillon Regional County Municipality, Quebec
Brossard—La Prairie
La Prairie (provincial electoral district)
Rivière de la Tortue (Delson)

References

External links

Ville de Candiac Website (French Only)

Cities and towns in Quebec
Incorporated places in Roussillon Regional County Municipality
Quebec populated places on the Saint Lawrence River
Greater Montreal